The 54th Golden Bell Awards was held on October 5, 2019 at the Sun Yat-sen Memorial Hall in Taipei, Taiwan. The ceremony was televised by Sanlih E-Television and Public Television Service. Mickey Huang was the host for the night. Veteran host Chang Hsiao-yen was named the recipient of the Lifetime Achievement Award.

Winners and nominees
Below is the list of winners and nominees for the main categories.

References

External links
 Official website of the 54th Golden Bell Awards

2019
2019 television awards
2019 in Taiwan